Free City is the only studio album by hip-hop group St. Lunatics. It was released on June 5, 2001, almost a full year after the release of group member Nelly's debut, Country Grammar. The album was a commercial success as it debuted at number 3 on the Billboard 200 with 196,000 copies sold in its first week. The album was certified Platinum by the RIAA a month later.

The title Free City came from their fifth member City Spud who was incarcerated at the time of release.

Track listing
"Just for You (The Introductory Poem)" (feat. Amber Tabares) (1:26)
"S.T.L." (5:21) (Kyjuan, Ali, Murphy Lee, Nelly)
"Okay" (3:50) (Ali, Murphy Lee, Kyjuan)
"Summer in the City" (4:37) (Nelly, Kyjuan, Murphy Lee, Ali)
"Mad Baby Daddy (Skit), Part 1" (1:40)
"Boom D Boom" (3:27) (Ali)
"Midwest Swing" (4:40) (Nelly, Murphy Lee, Kyjuan, Ali)
"Show 'Em What They Won" (4:31) (Ali, Nelly, Kyjuan, Murphy Lee)
"Let Me in Now" (4:42) (Nelly, Ali, Murphy Lee, Kyjuan)
"Diz Iz Da Life" (4:31) (Ali, Murphy Lee, Kyjuan, Nelly)
"Mad Baby Daddy (Skit), Part 2" (1:06)
"Scandalous" (3:29) (Murphy Lee)
"Groovin' Tonight" (feat. Brian McKnight) (5:21) (Ali, Nelly, City Spud)
"Jang a Lang" (feat. Penelope) (4:24) (Nelly, Murphy Lee, Kyjuan)
"Mad Baby Daddy (Skit), Part 3" (1:44)
"Real Niggaz" (4:26) (Nelly, Kyjuan, Ali, Murphy Lee)
"Here We Come" (4:12) (Nelly)
"Love You So" (feat. Cardan) (4:03) (Ali, Murphy Lee) 
"Mad Baby Daddy (Skit), Part 4" (3:32)
"Batter Up" (Bonus track) (5:27) (Nelly, Ali, Murphy Lee)

Personnel
Credits for Free City adapted from CD Universe.
St. Lunatics - lead vocals
Jason "Jay E" Epperson - producer
Waiel "Wally" Yaghnam - producer
Steve Eigner - engineer
Lavell "City Spud" Webb - producer
Penelope - backing vocals
Amber Tabares - backing vocals
Little Rock - backing vocals
Donneash Ferguson - backing vocals
Duro Gimel "Young Guru" Keaton - engineer
Cardan - additional vocals
Brian McKnight - additional vocals
John Adler - mixing
Steve Eigner - guitar
Bashiri Johnson - percussion
Richard Travali- mixing
Jonathan Mannion - photographer

Charts

Weekly charts

Year-end charts

Certifications

References

2001 debut albums
Universal Records albums